Corbin City is a city in Atlantic County, New Jersey, United States. As of the 2020 United States Census, the city's population was 471, a decrease of 21 (−4.3%) from the 2010 census count of 492, which in turn reflected an increase of 24 (+5.1%) from the 468 counted in the 2000 Census.

Corbin City was incorporated as a city by an act of the New Jersey Legislature on March 11, 1922, from portions of Weymouth Township. The borough was named for 19th-century banking and railroad entrepreneur, Austin Corbin.

History

The city has been one of several New Jersey municipalities that have considered consolidation. Corbin City announced it 2008 that it was investigating a prospective merger with neighboring Upper Township, across the county line in Cape May County, citing proximity and that Corbin City's children already attend Upper Township schools. There are no municipalities within New Jersey that have incorporated lands within multiple counties, and by 2010 Cape May County's Board of Chosen Freeholders objected to the plan, citing an analysis that the added costs of serving Corbin City would exceed revenues.

Geography
According to the United States Census Bureau, the city had a total area of 8.97 square miles (23.24 km2), including 7.70 square miles (19.94 km2) of land and 1.28 square miles (3.3 km2) of water (14.23%).

Unincorporated communities, localities and place names located partially or completely within the city include Buck Hill and Rock Point.

The city borders the municipalities of Egg Harbor Township and Estell Manor in Atlantic County; and Upper Township in Cape May County.

The city is one of 56 South Jersey municipalities that are included within the New Jersey Pinelands National Reserve, a protected natural area of unique ecology covering , that has been classified as a United States Biosphere Reserve and established by Congress in 1978 as the nation's first National Reserve. All of the city is included either in the state-designated Pinelands area (which includes portions of Atlantic County, along with areas in Burlington, Camden, Cape May, Cumberland, Gloucester and Ocean counties) or in the Pinelands National Reserve.

Demographics

Corbin City is the least-populous municipality with the city type of government in New Jersey. While there are municipalities with smaller populations, they are either boroughs, towns, townships or villages.

2010 census

2000 census
As of the 2000 United States census there were 468 people, 172 households, and 120 families residing in the city. The racial makeup of the city was 94.02% White, 2.78% African American, 0.85% Native American, 1.28% Asian, 0.64% from other races, and 0.43% from two or more races. Hispanic or Latino of any race were 2.99% of the population.

There were 172 households, out of which 37.2% had children under the age of 18 living with them, 56.4% were married couples living together, 8.7% had a female householder with no husband present, and 29.7% were non-families. 22.7% of all households were made up of individuals, and 8.7% had someone living alone who was 65 years of age or older. The average household size was 2.72 and the average family size was 3.21.

In the city the population was spread out, with 29.9% under the age of 18, 4.9% from 18 to 24, 29.3% from 25 to 44, 25.4% from 45 to 64, and 10.5% who were 65 years of age or older. The median age was 36 years. For every 100 females, there were 98.3 males. For every 100 females age 18 and over, there were 105.0 males.

The median income for a household in the city was $47,083, and the median income for a family was $56,000. Males had a median income of $35,938 versus $27,250 for females. The per capita income for the city was $21,321. None of the families and 4.9% of the population were living below the poverty line, including no under eighteens and 17.0% of those over 64.

Government

Local government
Corbin City operates within the City form of New Jersey municipal government. The city is one of 15 municipalities (of the 564) statewide that use this traditional form of government. The city's governing body is comprised of the Mayor and the three-member City Council. The Mayor is elected at-large to a two-year term of office and the City Council has three members elected at-large to three-year terms in office on a staggered basis, with one seat coming up for election each year as part of the November general election in a three-year cycle.

, the Mayor of Corbin City is Republican Robert J. Schulte, whose term of office ends December 31, 2022. Members of the City Council are Council President LaVerne Kirn (R, 2024), Thomas Bennis (R, 2022; appointed to serve an unexpired term) and Bill Collins (R, 2023).

In January 2022, the City Council selected former councilmember Thomas Bennis from a list of three candidates nominated by the Republican municipal committee to file the seat vacated by Kristofer Surran, who resigned the previous month amid his accusations that his council colleagues had been violating the state's Open Public Meetings Act by addressing official city business outside of public meetings.

In 2018, the city had an average property tax bill of $3,680, the lowest in the county, compared to an average bill of $6,367 in Atlantic County and $8,767 statewide.

Federal, state and county representation
Corbin City is located in the 2nd Congressional District and is part of New Jersey's 1st state legislative district. Prior to the 2011 reapportionment following the 2010 Census, Corbin City had been in the 2nd state legislative district.

 

Atlantic County is governed by a directly elected county executive and a nine-member Board of County Commissioners, responsible for legislation. The executive serves a four-year term and the commissioners are elected to staggered three-year terms, of which four are elected from the county on an at-large basis and five of the commissioners represent equally populated districts. , Atlantic County's Executive is Republican Dennis Levinson, whose term of office ends December 31, 2023. Members of the Board of County Commissioners are:

Ernest D. Coursey, District 1, including Atlantic City (part), Egg Harbor Township (part), and Pleasantville (D, 2022, Atlantic City), Chair Maureen Kern, District 2, including Atlantic City (part), Egg Harbor Township (part), Linwood, Longport, Margate City, Northfield, Somers Point and Ventnor City (R, 2024, Somers Point), Andrew Parker III, District 3, including Egg Harbor Township (part) and Hamilton Township (part) (R, Egg Harbor Township, 2023), Richard R. Dase, District 4, including Absecon, Brigantine, Galloway Township and Port Republic (R, 2022, Galloway Township), James A. Bertino, District 5, including Buena, Buena Vista Township, Corbin City, Egg Harbor City, Estell Manor, Folsom, Hamilton Township (part), Hammonton, Mullica Township and Weymouth Township (R, 2018, Hammonton), Caren L. Fitzpatrick, At-Large (D, 2023, Linwood), Frank X. Balles, At-Large (R, Pleasantville, 2024) Amy L. Gatto, Freeholder (R, 2022, Hamilton Township) and Vice Chair John W. Risley, At-Large (R, 2023, Egg Harbor Township) 

Atlantic County's constitutional officers are: 
County Clerk Joesph J. Giralo (R, 2026, Hammonton),  
Sheriff Eric Scheffler (D, 2024, Northfield) and 
Surrogate James Curcio (R, 2025, Hammonton).

Politics
As of March 23, 2011, there were a total of 303 registered voters in Corbin City, of which 54 (17.8% vs. 30.5% countywide) were registered as Democrats, 135 (44.6% vs. 25.2%) were registered as Republicans and 114 (37.6% vs. 44.3%) were registered as Unaffiliated. There were no voters registered to other parties. Among the city's 2010 Census population, 61.6% (vs. 58.8% in Atlantic County) were registered to vote, including 80.2% of those ages 18 and over (vs. 76.6% countywide).

In the 2012 presidential election, Republican Mitt Romney received 138 votes (58.0% vs. 41.1% countywide), ahead of Democrat Barack Obama with 91 votes (38.2% vs. 57.9%) and other candidates with 7 votes (2.9% vs. 0.9%), among the 238 ballots cast by the city's 315 registered voters, for a turnout of 75.6% (vs. 65.8% in Atlantic County). In the 2008 presidential election, Republican John McCain received 150 votes (62.5% vs. 41.6% countywide), ahead of Democrat Barack Obama with 85 votes (35.4% vs. 56.5%) and other candidates with 5 votes (2.1% vs. 1.1%), among the 240 ballots cast by the city's 317 registered voters, for a turnout of 75.7% (vs. 68.1% in Atlantic County). In the 2004 presidential election, Republican George W. Bush received 143 votes (63.8% vs. 46.2% countywide), ahead of Democrat John Kerry with 77 votes (34.4% vs. 52.0%) and other candidates with 1 vote (0.4% vs. 0.8%), among the 224 ballots cast by the city's 278 registered voters, for a turnout of 80.6% (vs. 69.8% in the whole county).

In the 2013 gubernatorial election, Republican Chris Christie received 134 votes (68.4% vs. 60.0% countywide), ahead of Democrat Barbara Buono with 50 votes (25.5% vs. 34.9%) and other candidates with 5 votes (2.6% vs. 1.3%), among the 196 ballots cast by the city's 324 registered voters, yielding a 60.5% turnout (vs. 41.5% in the county). In the 2009 gubernatorial election, Republican Chris Christie received 95 votes (58.3% vs. 47.7% countywide), ahead of Democrat Jon Corzine with 60 votes (36.8% vs. 44.5%), Independent Chris Daggett with 6 votes (3.7% vs. 4.8%) and other candidates with no votes (0.0% vs. 1.2%), among the 163 ballots cast by the city's 308 registered voters, yielding a 52.9% turnout (vs. 44.9% in the county).

Education
Corbin City is a non-operating school district. Students attend public school for pre-kindergarten through eighth grade in the Upper Township School District, as part of a sending/receiving relationship. As of the 2018–19 school year, the district, comprised of three schools, had an enrollment of 1,448 students and 131.0 classroom teachers (on an FTE basis), for a student–teacher ratio of 11.1:1. Schools in the district (with 2018–19 enrollment data from the National Center for Education Statistics) are 
Upper Township Primary School with 492 students in grades Pre-K–2, 
Upper Township Elementary School with 481 students in grades 3–5 and 
Upper Township Middle School with 469 students in grades 6–8.

High school students in public school for ninth through twelfth grades attend Ocean City High School in Ocean City as part of a sending/receiving relationship with the Ocean City School District, together with students from Longport, Ocean City, Sea Isle City and Upper Township. As of the 2018–2019 school year, the high school had an enrollment of 1,245 students and 98.5 classroom teachers (on an FTE basis), for a student–teacher ratio of 12.6:1.

City public school students are also eligible to attend the Atlantic County Institute of Technology in the Mays Landing section of Hamilton Township or the Charter-Tech High School for the Performing Arts, located in Somers Point.

Transportation

Roads and highways

Route 50 is the main road that passes through the city. The Garden State Parkway is accessible in neighboring Upper Township.

Public transportation
NJ Transit provide bus service in the city on the 315 route that runs between Cape May and Philadelphia.

Media
Two FM radio stations serving the greater Atlantic City area transmit from a site in Corbin City. They are WENJ (97.3), an ESPN Radio affiliate licensed to Millville with studios  in Northfield, and WRTQ (91.3), an Ocean City-licensed relay of WRTI in Philadelphia, which programs classical music and jazz.

References

External links

 
 The School District of Upper Township
 Ocean City School District
 
 School Data for the Ocean City School District, National Center for Education Statistics

 
1922 establishments in New Jersey
Cities in Atlantic County, New Jersey
City form of New Jersey government
New Jersey District Factor Group none
Populated places established in 1922